Elena Jikhareva  (born 8 July 1974) is a former Russian footballer who played as a defender for the Russia women's national football team. She was part of the team at the UEFA Women's Euro 2001. On club level she played for Ryazan-VDV in Russia.

References

1974 births
Living people
Russian Women's Football Championship players
Russian women's footballers
Russia women's international footballers
Place of birth missing (living people)
Women's association football defenders
Ryazan-VDV players